This is a list of Maltese-language poets, together with some of their best-known poems.

Poets 
 Pietru Caxaro (died 1485) – The first noted Maltese poet
 Ġan Franġisk Bonamico (1639–1680)
 Gioacchino Navarro (1748–1813)
 Patri Fidiel, (c. 1762–1824)
 Mons. Ludovik Mifsud Tommasi (1796–1879) – Canon of the Collegiate of Cospicua
 Ġan Anton Vassallo (1817–1868)
 Ġużè Muscat Azzopardi (1853–1927)
 Manwel Dimech (1860–1921)
 Dun Karm Psaila (1871–1961)
 Rużar Briffa (1906–1963)
 Anton Buttigieg (1912–1983)
 Marjanu Vella (1927–1988)
 Pawlu Aquilina (born 1929)
 Rigu Bovingdon (born 1942)
 Joe Friggieri (born 1946)
 Oliver Friggieri (1947–2020)
 Ray Buttigieg (born 1955)
 Immanuel Mifsud (born 1967)
 Nadia Mifsud (born 1976)
 Claudia Gauci (born 1976)
 Clare Azzopardi (born 1977)
 Elizabeth Grech (born 1978)
 Leanne Ellul (born 1989)
 Elena Cardona (born ?)

References 
 Il-Poeżija Maltija, an anthology by Oliver Friggieri, Malta University Publishers.

Maltese language

Maltese language